The 2001 Rhineland-Palatinate state election was held on 25 March 2001 to elect the members of the Landtag of Rhineland-Palatinate. The incumbent coalition government of the Social Democratic Party (SPD) and Free Democratic Party (FDP) led by Minister-President Kurt Beck retained its majority and continued in office.

Parties
The table below lists parties represented in the previous Landtag of Rhineland-Palatinate.

Opinion polling

Election result

|-
! colspan="2" | Party
! Votes
! %
! +/-
! Seats 
! +/-
! Seats %
|-
| bgcolor=| 
| align=left | Social Democratic Party (SPD)
| align=right| 820,610
| align=right| 44.8
| align=right| 5.0
| align=right| 49
| align=right| 6
| align=right| 48.5
|-
| bgcolor=| 
| align=left | Christian Democratic Union (CDU)
| align=right| 647,238
| align=right| 35.3
| align=right| 3.4
| align=right| 38
| align=right| 3
| align=right| 37.6
|-
| bgcolor=| 
| align=left | Free Democratic Party (FDP)
| align=right| 143,427
| align=right| 7.8
| align=right| 1.1
| align=right| 8
| align=right| 2
| align=right| 7.9
|-
| bgcolor=| 
| align=left | Alliance 90/The Greens (Grüne)
| align=right| 95,567
| align=right| 5.2
| align=right| 1.7
| align=right| 6
| align=right| 1
| align=right| 5.9
|-
! colspan=8|
|-
| bgcolor=| 
| align=left | Free Voters (FW)
| align=right| 46,549
| align=right| 2.5
| align=right| 2.5
| align=right| 0
| align=right| ±0
| align=right| 0
|-
| bgcolor=| 
| align=left | The Republicans (REP)
| align=right| 44,586
| align=right| 2.4
| align=right| 1.1
| align=right| 0
| align=right| ±0
| align=right| 0
|-
| bgcolor=|
| align=left | Others
| align=right| 35,869
| align=right| 2.0
| align=right| 
| align=right| 0
| align=right| ±0
| align=right| 0
|-
! align=right colspan=2| Total
! align=right| 1,833,846
! align=right| 100.0
! align=right| 
! align=right| 101
! align=right| ±0
! align=right| 
|-
! align=right colspan=2| Voter turnout
! align=right| 
! align=right| 62.2
! align=right| 8.6
! align=right| 
! align=right| 
! align=right| 
|}

Sources
 The Federal Returning Officer

2001
Rhineland-Palatinate
March 2001 events in Europe